Sargayazovo (Harğayaź) is a rural locality (a village) in Baygildinsky Selsoviet, Nurimanovsky District, Bashkortostan, Russia. The population was 47 as of 2010. There is 1 street.

Geography 
Satlyk is located 38 km south of Krasnaya Gorka (the district's administrative centre) by road. Kushkulevo is the nearest rural locality.

References 

Rural localities in Nurimanovsky District